North Caucasian Federal District (Severo-Kavkazsky federalny okrug) is one of the eight federal districts of Russia. It is located in extreme southern Russia, in the geographical area of the North Caucasus. The federal district was split from Southern Federal District on 19 January 2010. The current Envoy is Yury Chaika.

Demographics

Ethnic Russians constitute less than one-third of the total population at 2,857,851 (28.83%) according to the 2021 Census, but constitute a majority of 80% in Stavropol Krai and are at least 15% of the population in North Ossetia, Kabardino-Balkaria, and Karachay-Cherkessia. A diverse assortment of mostly Muslim Chechen speaking ethnic and tribal groups form the remainder. The North Caucasus Federal District is Russia's only Muslim-majority district, and is the only federal district that does not have an ethnic Russian majority.

According to the results of the 2021 census, according to Rosstat, the ethnic composition of the district is as follows:

Federal subjects

Total fertility rate 

2005 – 1.64
2010 – 1.99
2015 – 1.98
2019 – 1.78

Life expectancy

Presidential plenipotentiary envoys
Alexander Khloponin (19 January 2010 – 12 May 2014)
 Sergey Melikov (12 May 2014 – 28 July 2016)
 Oleg Belaventsev (28 July 2016 – 26 June 2018)
 Aleksandr Matovnikov (26 June 2018 – 22 January 2020)
 Yury Chaika (22 January 2020 – present)

External links
SKFO.RU – regional information portal
North Caucasian news portal

References

 
Federal districts of Russia
Geography of Southern Russia
States and territories established in 2010
2010 establishments in Russia